Pararrhaptica lysimachiae is a moth of the family Tortricidae. It was first described by Otto Swezey in 1933. It is endemic to the Hawaiian island of Kauai.

The larvae feed on Lysimachia glutinosa and Lysimachia hillebrandi venosa. The larvae have been found on the leaves of their host plant.

External links

Archipini
Endemic moths of Hawaii